Carboxypeptidase X, M14 family member 2 is a protein that in humans is encoded by the CPXM2 gene.

References

Further reading